The Three-Body Problem is an unreleased Chinese science fiction 3D film, adapted from The Three-Body Problem series by Liu Cixin, directed by Zhang Fanfan, and starring Feng Shaofeng and Zhang Jingchu.

In March 2018, Amazon was rumored to be negotiating for the rights to the project. However, YooZoo Pictures released a statement in response stating that it was the "sole owner of the rights for film and TV series adaptations." Although it "was originally scheduled to be released in 2017," the project "was postponed indefinitely due to the company's internal shuffling and the rumored 'bad quality' of the film's first cut."

Production
The film had a budget of CN¥200 million (US$30 million). Filming began in March 2015 in Heilongjiang and ended in July 2015, produced by YooZoo Film established in 2014 by Lin Qi.

References

External links

Alien invasions in films
Chinese 3D films
Chinese science fiction films
English-language films
Films based on Chinese novels
Films based on science fiction novels
Films set in China
Films shot in Heilongjiang
Unreleased films
Films directed by Zhang Fanfan
2010s Mandarin-language films